Viking rock (also known as Vikingarock in Swedish) is a rock music genre that takes much of its themes from 19th-century Viking romanticism, mixing it with elements of rockabilly, Oi! or street punk, and folk music. Frequent themes occurring in Viking rock include vikings and Norse mythology, as well as Sweden's King Karl XII and the Caroleans.

Viking rock is often linked to white supremacy. Many make no distinction between Viking rock and white power music, and there is debate whether Viking rock is essentially racist. Some viking rock bands, however, allegedly disapprove of racism such as the Swedish band Hel.

Kuggnäsfestivalen is a music festival that caters to viking rock.

List of notable Viking rock bands
Glittertind
Hel
Ultima Thule

References

External links
 Vikingarock.se - Sweden's largest homepage about Viking rock

 

nl:Vikingarock